This is a list of the members of the 1922 Seanad Éireann, the upper house of the Oireachtas (legislature) of the Irish Free State. It was first constituted on 8 December 1922. The Free State Seanad was elected in stages and thus considered to be in permanent session. However, in continuity with its Free State predecessor, the first Seanad elected after 1937 is numbered as the "Second Seanad". The Free State Senate, despite the occurrence of five senatorial elections before its abolition, is considered to have been a single 'Seanad' for the duration of its existence and is thus referred for that whole period as the "First Seanad".

Initial membership
The Constitution of the Irish Free State established the Oireachtas as a bicameral legislature consisting of a lower house, the Dáil, and an upper house, the Senate or Seanad. The Seanad's raison d'être was the assurance during the 1921 negotiation of the Anglo-Irish Treaty given by Arthur Griffith to southern unionists and the British government that unionists would have adequate representation in the new parliament to safeguard their interests. The "Third Dáil", elected in elected in June 1922 as a "provisional parliament" or "constituent assembly", approved the Constitution in September, and continued as the Dáil of the new Free State when the Constitution came into force on 6 December 1922. However, there was no pre-existing body which might be repurposed as the Seanad, so this had to be constructed from scratch.

The Constitution specified a 60-seat Seanad, with Senators serving 12-year terms and divided into four cohorts with one cohort re-elected every three years. For the initial 1922 Seanad, 30 were to be nominated by the President of the Executive Council and the other 30 elected by the Dáil. The President's selections would provide the second and fourth cohorts, for re-election in 1928 and 1934; the Dáil's provided the first and third, for re-election in 1925 and 1931.

To honour Griffith's 1921 commitment, the Constitution required that the President of the Executive Council in making his nominations should "have special regard to the providing of representation for groups or parties not then adequately represented in Dáil Éireann". In October 1922, the provisional parliament passed a resolution moved by W. T. Cosgrave, who had succeeded Griffith as chairman of the Provisional Government, which stated that the President should "consult with representative persons and bodies, including the following: Chamber of commerce, the Royal College of Physicians of Ireland, the Royal College of Surgeons in Ireland, the Benchers of the Honourable Society of King's Inns, Dublin, the Incorporated Law Society of Ireland, Councils of the County boroughs of the Irish Free State".  Cosgrave announced his selection in the Dáil on 6 December 1922, immediately after his election as president had been ratified by the Governor-General. The 15 who would serve 12-year terms were selected by lot.

The Dáil election was conducted on 7 December 1922 by single transferable vote as a single 30-member district. The procedure to be used was specified in a Dáil resolution of 1 November and published in Iris Oifigiúil on 7 November. A candidate for election had to be nominated and seconded by a TD; many were nominated by Cosgrave on submission from various public bodies. Nominations closed at midday on 7 December; ballots were distributed at 3 pm, the poll closed at 5pm, and counting began immediately. At 8 pm, the Ceann Comhairle, who was also the returning officer, announced the result would not be known for some time, and the Dáil was adjourned. President Cosgrave had announced the assassination of Sean Hales during the Irish Civil War. Eighty-one TDs voted; none of the abstentionist TDs were eligible to vote or nominate candidates. To facilitate transfer of fractions of votes, each initial vote's value was multiplied by 1000, giving a quota of 2,613.  Eighteen candidates were elected on the first count: one with four (4,000) first-preference votes and 17 others with three (3,000) each. The report on the conduct of the election speculated that groups of three TDs had coordinated their votes to ensure a candidate exceeded the quota. Candidates with equal numbers of first-preference votes were ranked by the number of second preferences and so on. The remaining twelve Senators were elected in 34 subsequent counts. Counting was completed after midnight, the results were announced next afternoon, and the Seanad first assembled on 11 December 1922.

Of the sixty members of the first Senate, as well as 36 Catholics, there were 20 Protestants, 3 Quakers and 1 Jew. It contained 7 peers, a dowager countess (Ellen, Countess of Desart, who was Jewish), 5 baronets and several knights. The New York Times remarked that the first senate was "representative of all classes", though it has also been described as, "the most curious political grouping in the history of the Irish state".

On 26 November 1924, Alice Stopford Green presented to the Seanad a vellum parchment signed by all but one member of the 1922–25 Seanad, in an ornate casket commissioned from Mia Cranwill based on Gallarus Oratory. After the 1936 abolition of the Seanad, the casket was donated to the Royal Irish Academy.

Party composition
The following table shows the composition by party when the 1922 Seanad first met on 11 December 1922.

List of senators

Changes

Footnotes

See also
Members of the 3rd Dáil
Government of the 3rd Dáil

Sources
 Constitution of the Irish Free State, 1922

References

 
 1922